"Shut Me Up" is a single by Mindless Self Indulgence, released on September 12, 2006. It is the first track on their third studio album, You'll Rebel to Anything. "Shut Me Up" peaked at number 7 on the Billboard Hot Singles Sales chart and number 1 on the Hot Dance Singles Sales chart.

Track listing 
 "Shut Me Up" (Ulrich Wild Groandome Metal Mix) – 2:56
 "Shut Me Up" (VNV Nation 1200 XL Mix) – 5:40
 "Shut Me Up" (Tommie Sunshine TSMV Still Filthy Mix) – 5:38
 "Shut Me Up" (Original Crappy Demo) – 1:55
 "Big Poppa" (Notorious B.I.G. cover) – 3:57
 "Adios Amigos" – 2:24
 "Straight to Video" (Suicide City More and Faster Mix) – 2:55
 "Straight to Video" (Tommie Sunshine Extended Electro Mix) – 5:57

Music video
The video for "Shut Me Up" features Joshua Burian-Mohr as a store clerk who goes insane before going into seizures and exploding, several days after going to a concert by the band. It was directed by Jhonen Vasquez, the creator of the TV show Invader Zim as well as the comics Johnny the Homicidal Maniac, Squee!, and I Feel Sick. The video also features clips from Reefer Madness and a shot of Vasquez's hand-puppet.

References

Mindless Self Indulgence songs
2005 songs
2006 singles
Works by Jhonen Vasquez